Richárd Tusori (born 12 July 1984, in Miskolc) is a Hungarian football (defender) player who currently plays for [[Sv Weng
]].

References 
HLSZ 
Nemzeti Sport 

1984 births
Living people
Sportspeople from Miskolc
Hungarian footballers
Association football defenders
BFC Siófok players
Hungarian expatriate footballers
Expatriate footballers in Germany
Hungarian expatriate sportspeople in Germany